The Pakistani film industry produced over fifteen feature films in 2014. This article includes an overview of the major 2014 events in Pakistani film, including film festivals and awards ceremonies, as well as lists of those films that have been particularly well received, both critically and financially.

Top Grossing Films

The highest grossing films released in 2014 by worldwide gross are as follows:

Events

Award ceremonies

Releases

Other Releases

See also
 2014 in film
 2014 in Pakistan
 Cinema of Pakistan
 List of Pakistani submissions for the Academy Award for Best Foreign Language Film

References

External links

Pakistani
2014
Films